Alexander Nikolaiyevich Drozdetsky  also known as Aleksandr Drozdetsky (born 10 November 1981), is a Russian former professional ice hockey player. He played 14 seasons primarily in the Russian Superleague (RSL) and Kontinental Hockey League (KHL).

Playing career
Drozdetsky was selected by the Philadelphia Flyers in the 3rd round (94th overall) of the 2000 NHL Entry Draft. Inge Hammarström, the Flyers' chief European scout at the time and who had in previous drafts successfully lobbied for the Flyers to select Peter Forsberg, Mikael Renberg, Dmitri Yushkevich, and Janne Niinimaa, likened Drozdetsky to a young Igor Larionov and predicted he would be playing for the Flyers within two years.

Career statistics

References

External links
 

1981 births
Avangard Omsk players
Ak Bars Kazan players
Avtomobilist Yekaterinburg players
HC CSKA Moscow players
HC Neftekhimik Nizhnekamsk players
HC Spartak Moscow players
Living people
Philadelphia Flyers draft picks
Russian ice hockey right wingers
Severstal Cherepovets players
SKA Saint Petersburg players